Aq Qaleh or Aqqaleh may refer to:

Ardabil Province
 Aq Qaleh, Ardabil
 Aq Qaleh, Sareyn

Golestan Province
 Aq Qaleh, Golestan

Markazi Province
 Aq Qaleh, Markazi

North Khorasan Province
 Aq Qaleh, Esfarayen
 Aq Qaleh, Shirvan

West Azerbaijan Province
 Aq Qaleh, West Azerbaijan